The Scottish Police Federation (SPF) is an organisation representing Scottish police officers. It has approximately 18,500 members across the Police Service of Scotland. It campaigns on issues that affect pay and conditions though police officers are not allowed to strike and reports to authorities on matters which affect their welfare and efficiency.

The Scottish Police Federation is led by General Secretary Calum Steele who has been in post since October 2008.

Chairperson

Footnote: John J Ryan, Glasgow, served four terms of office as chairman; 
William Cowie, BL, Glasgow, served two terms of office as chairman.

General Secretaries

Footnote: William Webster, OBE, Edinburgh, served two terms of office as Secretary.

See also
Association of Scottish Police Superintendents
Police Federation of England and Wales

References

External links
 Official website

Trade unions in Scotland
Police unions
Law enforcement in Scotland
1919 establishments in Scotland
Organisations based in Glasgow

Trade unions established in 1919